Judas Maccabaeus (HWV 63) is an oratorio in three acts composed in 1746 by George Frideric Handel based on a libretto written by Thomas Morell. The oratorio was devised as a compliment to the victorious Prince William Augustus, Duke of Cumberland upon his return from the Battle of Culloden (16 April, 1746). Other catalogues of Handel's music have referred to the work as HG xxii; and HHA 1/24.

Synopsis
Morell's libretto is based on the deuterocanonical (or apocryphal) book 1 Maccabees (2–8), with motives added from the Jewish Antiquities by Josephus.

The events depicted in the oratorio are from the period 170–160 BC when Judea was ruled by the Seleucid Empire which undertook to destroy the Jewish religion. Being ordered to worship Zeus, many Jews obeyed under the threat of persecution; however, some did not. One who defied was the elderly priest Mattathias who killed a fellow Jew who was about to offer a pagan sacrifice. After tearing down a pagan altar, Mattathias retreated to the hills and gathered others who were willing to fight for their faith.

Handel's music depicts the changing moods of the Jewish people as their fortunes vary from dejection to jubilation.

Part 1
The people mourn the death of their leader Mattathias, but his son Simon tries to restore their faith and calls them to arms (Arm, arm, ye brave). Simon's brother, Judas Maccabaeus, assumes the role of leader and inspires the people with thoughts of liberty and victory through the power of Jehovah.

Part 2
The people have been victorious, but Judas is concerned that vanity will cause the people to claim victory for themselves. When news arrives that the Seleucid commander Gorgias is preparing to enact revenge, the people's joyous mood gives way to wailing and dejection (Ah! wretched Israel!). Again Judas rallies the people (Sound an alarm) and insists that the pagan altars must be destroyed and that false religions must be resisted.

Part 3
Victory has finally been achieved for the Jewish people (See, the Conqu'ring Hero Comes!). News arrives that Rome is willing to form an alliance with Judas against the Seleucid empire. The people rejoice that peace has at last come to their country (O lovely peace).

First performance
The first performance took place on 1 April, 1747 at the Royal Opera House, and Judas Maccabaeus became one of Handel's most popular oratorios. The General Advertiser (issued on the day prior to the concert) announced the event as:

The performers in this original 1747 production included:
 Judas: John Beard (tenor)
 Israelite man: Caterina Galli (mezzo-soprano)
 Israelite woman: Elisabetta de Gambarini (soprano)
 Simon, brother to Judas: Thomas Reinhold (bass)
 Eupolemus, Jewish ambassador to Rome: Thomas Reinhold (bass)

The famous chorus See, the Conqu'ring Hero Comes! was composed during the summer of 1747 for Handel's next oratorio, Joshua. In the wake of its popularity, probably in 1751, Handel added it to Judas Maccabaeus, and so it forms a legitimate part of both oratorios.

Publication
The oratorio was published in London after the composer's death by William Randall, the successor to John Walsh.

Judas Maccabaeus was translated into German and published in 1866 as Volume 22 of the complete works series of the Händel-Gesellschaft.

Literary reference
Come, ever smiling Liberty, / And with thee bring thy jocund train is sung by Maria, the heroine of Mary Wollstonecraft's novel Maria (1798), at the point where she believes herself to have escaped from her abusive husband. She calls her state "Comparative liberty", suggesting that "the jocund train lagged far behind!" because she takes no pleasure in her need for the separation.

Adaptations

Reorchestration
A re-orchestration of Judas Maccabaeus has been attributed to Mozart. The score in question updates Handel's original in a similar way to Mozart's 1789 version of Handel's Messiah. It has been suggested that this version of Judas Maccabaeus represents one of the projects instigated by Mozart's patron Gottfried van Swieten, who promoted the revival of baroque music. However, unlike the re-orchestration of Messiah, which is definitely by Mozart, it has not been possible to confirm Judas Maccabaeus was his. The work survives in a score in an unknown hand which was rediscovered in 2001, having been presented to the Halifax Choral Society in 1850.

Nazi text
Under the Nazis the work was subject to "aryanization", a new text being provided so that Handel's music could be performed without reference to Jewish culture.

See, the Conqu'ring Hero Comes!
The third act chorus See, the Conqu'ring Hero Comes! has been adapted and re-used several times. 

In Britain during the 19th century, "See, the Conqu'ring Hero Comes!" gained familiarity as a tune frequently played by brass bands at the opening of new railway lines and stations.

Ludwig van Beethoven composed twelve variations for piano and cello in 1796 (WoO 45). Later, Henry Wood used the tune for a movement in his Fantasia on British Sea Songs (1905), which is regularly played at the Last Night of the Proms.

As a hymn tune, Handel's melody is most frequently associated with two texts: the German Advent song "" by Friedrich Heinrich Ranke (first published in 1826); and as an Easter hymn based on a French-language text by the Swiss writer Edmond Louis Budry (""), which was later translated in English as "Thine Be the Glory".

Orchestration
The following orchestration was recorded by Chrysander in the Händel-Gesellschaft edition of 1866:
 violins I, II
 violas
 cellos
 basses (double-bass, bassi)
 recorders I, II (flauto)
 oboes I, II
 flutes I, II (traversa)
 horns I, II (corno)
 trumpets I, II, III (tromba)
 bassoon I, II (fagotti)
 timpani
 organ
 keyboard

Dramatis personae
 Judas Maccabaeus (tenor)
 Simon, his Brother (bass)
 Israelitish Woman (soprano)
 Israelitish Man (mezzo-soprano)
 Eupolemus, the Jewish Ambassador to Rome (alto)
 First Messenger (alto)
 Second Messenger (bass)
 Chorus of Israelites
 Chorus of Youths
 Chorus of Virgins

Summary
The following table summarises the movements of the oratorio.

Recordings

See also
List of oratorios by George Frideric Handel

References
Citations

Sources

External links
 
 Full score (Google books)
 Full-text libretto online
 Background and synopsis of the oratorio
 Live Recording of Number 29, Air, So Rapid Thy Course Is (performed by Mary Gayle Greene, mezzo-soprano)
 Hebrew translation by Aharon Ashman
 Hebrew version by Levin Kipnis

Oratorios by George Frideric Handel
1746 compositions
Oratorios based on the Bible
Cultural depictions of the Maccabees